The 1902 Nobel Prize in Literature was the second prestigious literary award based upon Alfred Nobel's will, which  was given to German historian Theodor Mommsen (1817–1903) "the greatest living master of the art of historical writing, with special reference to his monumental work A History of Rome."

Laureate

Theodor Mommsen was a writer expert both in history and law, and this combination was important for his research career. His Nobel Prize was motivated primarily by his pioneering three-volume work about Roman history, Römische Geschichte. It depicted different aspects of the Roman Republic's history: political, legal, economic, cultural and even geographical and meteorological. According to the Swedish Academy, his writing was "vivid and empathetic", and it was for these literary qualities that he was awarded the Nobel Prize.

A History of Rome

When Mommsen was awarded the prize, the world recognition was given him with "special reference" to the 'Römische Geschichte (the History of Rome). The award came nearly fifty years after the first appearance of the work. The award also came during the last year of the author's life (1817–1903). It is the only time thus far that the Nobel Prize for Literature has been presented to a historian per se. Yet the literary Nobel has since been awarded to a philosopher (1950) with mention of an "intellectual history", and to a war-time leader (1953) for speeches and writings, including a "current events history", plus a Nobel Memorial Prize has been awarded for two "economic histories" (1993). Nonetheless Mommsen's multi-volume History of Rome remains in a singular Nobel class.

The 1911 Encyclopædia Britannica, a well-regarded reference yet nonetheless "a source unsparingly critical", summarizes: "Equally great as antiquary, jurist, political and social historian, Mommsen lived to see the time when among students of Roman history he had pupils, followers, critics, but no rivals. He combined the power of minute investigation with a singular faculty for bold generalization and the capacity for tracing out the effects of thought on political and social life."

The British historian G. P. Gooch, writing in 1913, eleven years after Mommsen's Nobel prize, gives us this evaluation of his Römisches Geschichte: "Its sureness of touch, its many-sided knowledge, its throbbing vitality and the Venetian colouring of its portraits left an ineffaceable impression on every reader." "It was a work of genius and passion, the creation of a young man, and is as fresh and vital to-day as when it was written." About the History of Rome another British historian Arnold J. Toynbee in 1934 wrote, at the beginning of his own 12-volume universal history, "Mommsen wrote a great book, [Römisches Geschichte],  which certainly will always be reckoned among the masterpieces of Western historical literature."

Deliberations

Nominations
Mommsen had not been nominated for the prize in 1901, making it the first rare occasion when an author have been awarded the Nobel Prize in Literature the same year they were first nominated. In total, the Swedish Academy received 44 nominations for 34 individuals, including the Russian novelist Leo Tolstoy (four nominations), British philosopher Herbert Spencer (one nomination), and Norwegian playwright Henrik Ibsen (one nomination).

The authors Philip James Bailey, Samuel Butler, Ethna Carbery, Mary Hartwell Catherwood, Francisco Javier de Burgos, Alice Marie Durand (known as Henry Gréville), Ernst Dümmler, Samuel Rawson Gardiner, Bret Harte, Annie French Hector, George Alfred Henty, Grace Hinsdale, Lionel Johnson, Heinrich Landesmann, William McGonagall, Ljubomir Nedić, Frank R. Stockton, Frank Norris, Masaoka Shiki, Gleb Uspensky, Jacint Verdaguer, Swami Vivekananda, and Mathilde Wesendonck died in 1902 without having been nominated for the prize.

{| class="wikitable mw-collapsible"
|+ class="nowrap" | Official list of nominees and their nominators for the prize
|-
! scope=col | No.
! scope=col | Nominee
! scope=col | Country
! scope=col | Genre(s)
! scope=col | Nominator(s)
|-
|1
|Juhani Aho (1861–1921)
|()
|novel, short story
|
|-
|2
|Marcel Barrière (1860–1954)
|
|novel, essays
|Émile Faguet (1847–1916)
|-
|3
|Alexander Baumgartner, S.J. (1841–1910)
|
|poetry, history
|Knud Karl Krogh-Tonning (1842–1911)
|-
|4
|Bjørnstjerne Bjørnson (1832–1910)
|
|poetry, novel, drama, short story
|
|-
|5
|Bernard Bosanquet (1848–1923)
|
|philosophy
|William Macneile Dixon (1866–1946)
|-
|6
|Giosuè Carducci (1835–1907)
|
|poetry, literary criticism, biography, essays
|
|-
|7
|Houston Stewart Chamberlain{{efn|group=notes|Chamberlain: Richard Wagner (1895), Die Grundlagen des neunzehnten Jahrhunderts ("The Foundations of the Nineteenth Century", 1899), Die Worte Christi ("The Word of Christ, 1901), and Immanuel Kant. Die Persönlichkeit als Einführung in das Werk ("Immanuel Kant: The Personality as an Introduction to the Work", 1905)}} (1855–1927)
|
|philosophy
|Wolfgang Golther (1863–1945)
|-
|8
|José Echegaray Eizaguirre (1832–1916)
|
|drama
|12 members of the Royal Spanish Academy
|-
|9
|Gustav Falke (1853–1916)
|
|novel, poetry
|August Sauer (1855–1926)
|-
|10
|Antonio Fogazzaro (1842–1911)
|
|novel, poetry, short story
|Per Geijer (1886–1976)
|-
|11
|Arne Garborg (1851–1921)
|
|novel, poetry, drama, essays
|Kristian Birch-Reichenwald Aars (1868–1917)
|-
|12
|Hartmann Grisar, S.J. (1845–1932)
|
|history, theology
|Knud Karl Krogh-Tonning (1842–1911)
|-
|13
|Gerhart Hauptmann (1862–1946)
|
|drama, novel
|
|-
|14
|Henrik Ibsen (1828–1906)
|
|drama
|Axel Erdmann (1873–1954)
|-
|15
|Ferenc Kemény (1860–1944)
|()
|essays
|Gusztáv Heinrich (1845–1922)
|-
|16
|Anatoly Koni (1844–1927)
|
|poetry, literary criticism, memoir, law
|Anton Woulfert (1877–1927)
|-
|17
|Ventura López Fernández (1866–1944)
|
|poetry, drama, literary criticism
|Emmanuel Casado Salas (?)
|-
|18
|George Meredith (1828–1909)
|
|novel, poetry
|
|-
|19
|Frédéric Mistral (1830–1914)
|
|poetry, philology
|
|-
|style="background:gold;white-space:nowrap"|20
|style="background:gold;white-space:nowrap"|Theodor Mommsen (1817–1903)
|style="background:gold;white-space:nowrap"|
|style="background:gold;white-space:nowrap"|history, law
|style="background:gold;white-space:nowrap"|18 members of the Prussian Academy of Sciences
|-
|21
|John Morley (1838–1923)
|
|biography, literary criticism, essays
|Alice Stopford Green (1847–1929)
|-
|22
|Lewis Morris (1833–1907)
|
|poetry, songwriting, essays
|
|-
|23
|Gaspar Núñez de Arce (1832–1903)
|
|poetry, drama, law	
|
|-
|24
|Gaston Paris (1839–1903)
|
|history, poetry, essays
|Fredrik Wulff (1845–1930)
|-
|25
|Archibald Robertson (1853–1931)
|
|theology, history
|John Wesley Hales (1836–1914)
|-
|26
|Paul Sabatier (1858–1928)
|
|history, theology, biography
|Carl Bildt (1850–1931)
|-
|27
|Henryk Sienkiewicz (1846–1916)
|()
|novel
|Hans Hildebrand (1842–1913)
|-
|28
|Herbert Spencer (1820–1903)
|
|philosophy, essays
|49 members of The Nobel Prize Committee of the Society of Authors
|-
|29
|Leo Tolstoy (1828–1910)
|
|novel, short story, drama, poetry
|
|-
|30
|Charles Wagner (1852–1918)
|
|theology, philosophy
|Waldemar Rudin (1833–1921)
|-
|31
|Carl Weitbrecht (1847–1904)
|
|history, poetry, short story, essays
|Hermann Fischer (1884–1936)
|-
|32
|William Butler Yeats
|
|poetry, drama, essays
|William Edward Lecky (1838–1903)
|-
|33
|Theodor Zahn (1838–1933)
|
|theology, essays
|Lars Dahle (1843–1925)
|-
|34
|Émile Zola (1839–1907)
|
|novel, drama, short story
|Marcellin Berthelot (1827–1907)
|}

Prize decision
The Academy considered Tolstoy and a shared prized to Ibsen and his countryman Bjørnstjerne Bjørnson as the main candidates for the 1902 prize, but the Academy's permanent secretary Carl David af Wirsén was a fierce opponent of the idea of awarding Tolstoy and Ibsen, arguing that neither of them were representative of the "ideal direction" outlined in Alfred Nobel's will. As a compromise, the historian Theodor Mommsen was launched as an alternative candidate that could be agreed upon.

Reactions
The decision to award the second Nobel Prize in Literature to a non-fiction writer was criticised by some. While praising Mommsen's work in a 1902 article in Ord och Bild'', the Swedish professor in Intellectual history Johan Bergman wrote: "It is and remain a flagrant injustice to not award this prize for the best literary work in ideal direction to one of the great idealists among the celebrated authors of our time, to Tolstoj or Björnson or Ibsen." Internationally, Henrik Ibsen and August Strindberg were frequently mentioned as worthy candidates for the prize.

Notes

References

External links
Award ceremony speech by C.D. af Wirsén nobelprize.org

1902